Edward F. Allodi AIA (1893–1987) was an Italian American architect who designed a number of important buildings for Roman Catholic Clients in Connecticut and New York during the early part of the 20th century.

Early life and career
Allodi was born in Palermo, Italy on October 24, 1893 and moved with his family to Boston, Massachusetts as a young child.
He attended the Boston Public Schools and received a bachelor's degree from the Boston Architectural Center (1918-1925) While there he won a scholarship to continue his studies at Princeton University (1925-1927). He also was the recipient of the Rotch Travelling Schaola of 1927.

Architectural practice
Allodi practiced from offices in Cape Cod Massachusetts and lived in Wellfleet, Massachusetts. He owned several local businesses including The Carpenters Shop, a woodworking business, the Galleries, a gift shop and interior design studio; and Allodi and Martin, an architect-engineer practice, all in Orleans.
 
Allodi entered practice in the New York-based firm of Boegel and Allodi in 1962 and became principal designer for two years beginning in 1966.

Allodi was Chairman of the Darian Housing Authority Connecticut (1929-1966), a member of the Darian Architectural Review Board (1961-1966), and the planning Board in Wellfleet MA beginning in 1970.

Legacy

Works include
 Notre Dame Church, Easton, Connecticut 1956
 St. Thomas the Apostle Church, Norwalk, Connecticut 1948
 St. Thomas the Apostle School and Convent, Norwalk, Connecticut 1958
 St. Mary Church, Flushing, New York 1967
 St. Fidelis Convent, College Point, New York 1967
 St. Jerome Convent, Queens, New York  1968
 St. Gregory School, Bellerose, New York 1968 (Boegel and Allodi)

References

1987 deaths
20th-century American architects
American ecclesiastical architects
Architects of Roman Catholic churches
Architects from Palermo
Italian emigrants to the United States
1893 births
People from Wellfleet, Massachusetts
Architects from Connecticut
Architects from Massachusetts